Helen Shenton (born 1958) is a naturalised Irish librarian who has worked in Dublin, London and Harvard. In 2014 she became the Librarian and College Archivist at the Library of Trinity College Dublin.

Life 
Shenton was born in April 1958. She graduated from University College London and subsequently studied at the London College of Printing.

Before she took up the role as librarian and archivist at Trinity she was Executive Director of Harvard Library. This role saw her bring together seventy-three individual libraries in areas such as digitisation, accessibility, collection and content development, and records management. Prior to this, she worked at the British Library and the Victoria and Albert Museum.

In May 2014, she took on the job of leading the Library of Trinity College Dublin. She was the first female Library director in the College's then 422-year history. In 2020, she announced that after public consultation the Library would be commissioning four new sculptures of Rosalind Franklin, Augusta Gregory, Ada Lovelace and Mary Wollstonecraft. These were the first new sculptures for over 100 years. Although the Library has 40 sculptures, they are all of men. The organisers had agreed that the four new sculptures would be restricted to that of notable dead women.

In 2022, the Library began relocating some of its most valuable books. The building where they are located, known as the Long Room, is to be renovated at an estimated cost of €90m. 750,000 books will be moved with some of them needing a centimetre of dust to be removed while others are extremely delicate. The complexity of the task is such that two years has been devoted to planning. Some of the books are valuable artefacts which includes the Book of Kells which dates from the ninth century.

In the same year, she gave the key note address at the IFLA conference.

References 

1958 births
Living people
Irish librarians
Women librarians